Benson is a city in Swift County, Minnesota, United States, along the Chippewa River. The population was 3,240 at the 2010 census. It is the county seat.

History
Benson was platted in 1870 when the railroad was extended to that point. As the end of the tracks, Benson became a lively trading center. Benson was the market for a 100-mile area in almost all directions.

The city was named for Ben H. Benson, a Norwegian settler. Benson was incorporated as a city in 1908.

The town's early history included many tragedies, such as an 1872 smallpox epidemic, an 1876 grasshopper plague, and a fire in 1880 that wiped out a whole city block.

In 1869, the first general store in Benson was established. A post office has been in operation at Benson since 1870. The Benson Public Library was established in 1911 after a generous donation. In 1912, the Swift County Hospital was built, originally housing 19 patients. The  Swift County-Benson Hospital has since been repeatedly renovated. Benson's first one-room schoolhouse still stands as a historic site in Ambush Park and is open to the public. The current schools were established in 1890 (Benson High School) and 1958 (Northside Elementary School).

Geography

U.S. Highway 12 and Minnesota State Highways 9 and 29 are three of the main routes in the city.

Climate

Demographics

2010 census
As of the census of 2010, there were 3,240 people, 1,469 households, and 828 families living in the city. The racial makeup of the city was 97.2% White, 0.5% African American, 0.4% Native American, 0.2% Asian, 0.1% Pacific Islander, 0.6% from other races, and 1.0% from two or more races. Hispanic or Latino of any race were 2.6% of the population.

There were 1,469 households, of which 24.8% had children under the age of 18 living with them, 44.7% were married couples living together, 8.0% had a female householder with no husband present, 3.7% had a male householder with no wife present, and 43.6% were non-families. 38.7% of all households were made up of individuals, and 21.2% had someone living alone who was 65 years of age or older. The average household size was 2.14 and the average family size was 2.85.

The median age in the city was 43.6 years. 21.9% of residents were under the age of 18; 7% were between the ages of 18 and 24; 22.5% were from 25 to 44; 25.9% were from 45 to 64; and 22.5% were 65 years of age or older. The gender makeup of the city was 47.8% male and 52.2% female.

2000 census
As of the census of 2000, there were 3,376 people, 1,451 households, and 880 families living in the city. The racial makeup of the city was 98.07% White, 0.24% African American, 0.24% Native American, 0.24% Asian, 0.06% Pacific Islander, 0.50% from other races, and 0.65% from two or more races. Hispanic or Latino of any race were 1.18% of the population.

There were 1,451 households, out of which 27.8% had children under the age of 18 living with them, 51.5% were married couples living together, 6.6% had a female householder with no husband present, and 39.3% were non-families. 36.2% of all households were made up of individuals, and 23.6% had someone living alone who was 65 years of age or older.  The average household size was 2.24 and the average family size was 2.94.

In the city, the population was spread out, with 23.5% under the age of 18, 7.7% from 18 to 24, 22.9% from 25 to 44, 21.6% from 45 to 64, and 24.4% who were 65 years of age or older.  The median age was 42 years. For every 100 females, there were 86.2 males.  For every 100 females age 18 and over, there were 82.9 males.

The median income for a household in the city was $32,234, and the median income for a family was $44,638. Males had a median income of $31,280 versus $23,444 for females. The per capita income for the city was $17,269.  About 3.2% of families and 8.0% of the population were below the poverty line, including 4.0% of those under age 18 and 14.7% of those age 65 or over.

Alternative energy 
Benson is home to the Chippewa Valley Ethanol Company (CVEC), which produces a variety of ethanol products including E85. The plant also produces food-grade ethyl alcohol for adult beverages.

Transport 
The city owns and operates the Benson Municipal Airport Veterans Field.

Notable people
 Darwin Hall (1844–1919), American politician who served in the U.S. House of Representatives from 1889 to 1891. Hall also served in the Minnesota House of Representatives and the Minnesota Senate.
Sandra Peterson, Minnesota state legislator

Bands
 Tiny Moving Parts (from nearby Clontarf), emo/math rock band

References

External links
City Website
Benson Public Schools

 
Cities in Minnesota
Cities in Swift County, Minnesota
County seats in Minnesota
1870 establishments in Minnesota
Populated places established in 1870